The Emmitsburg Historic District  is a national historic district in Emmitsburg, Frederick County, Maryland. The district is predominantly residential and includes most of the older area of the town extending along Main Street and Seton Avenue.  Also included are several commercial buildings and churches interspersed among the dwellings. The buildings are primarily two-story sided log or brick, dating from the late 18th to the mid 19th centuries. Some later 19th century buildings in this area include some large Italianate-influenced buildings forming the northeast and southeast corners of the main square; an area destroyed by fire in 1863. Settlement began in the region during the 1730s, bringing Protestant Germans and Scotch-Irish from Pennsylvania, as well as English Catholics from Tidewater Maryland.

It was added to the National Register of Historic Places in 1992.

References

External links
, including 1991 photo, at Maryland Historical Trust
Boundary Map of the Emmitsburg Historic District, Frederick County, at Maryland Historical Trust

Emmitsburg, Maryland
English-American culture in Maryland
German-American culture in Maryland
Pennsylvania Dutch culture in Maryland
Scotch-Irish American culture in Maryland
Historic districts on the National Register of Historic Places in Maryland
Italianate architecture in Maryland
Historic districts in Frederick County, Maryland
National Register of Historic Places in Frederick County, Maryland